Redfern Building in Manchester, England, is a Grade-II listed building which was completed in 1936. The building is situated on Dantzic Street and meets the junction of Mayes Street and Hanover Street. Redfern was originally built for office and warehouse use.

Redfern was built for the Co-operative Wholesale Society and is now part of the Co-operative Estate in Manchester which includes a number of listed 20th century buildings such as the CIS Tower and Hanover Building. The building bears resemblance to the prominent 1930s art deco movement and is inspired by Dutch Brick modernism according to Nikolaus Pevsner. Redfern was designed by W. A. Johnson and J. W. Cooper.

The seven-storey building has a flat roof and consists of pale brown brick. A noticeable service tower exists to the north of the building. Architecture critic Clare Hartwell writes, "It is a pity that this [building] does not enjoy a better site - its impact is partly lost due to its towering neighbours and its relationship with the adjoining Holyoake House."

In April 2017 - November 2018, Redfern housed PLANT, an open design studio and workshop for Manchester.

2019 Refurbishment
The building was comprehensively refurbished during 2018-2019 by Sheppard Robson architects.

References

Office buildings in Manchester
Grade II listed buildings in Manchester
Grade II listed office buildings
Brick buildings and structures